Benkadi Founia is a rural commune in the Cercle of Kita in the Kayes Region of south-western Mali. The commune includes 14 villages and in the 2009 census had a population of 11,599. The principal village is Founia Moribougou.

References

External links
.

Communes of Kayes Region